Alexandria Sporting Club, also commonly known as Sporting Alexandria and Sporting between the locals, is an Egyptian sports club based in Alexandria, Egypt. Founded in 1890, the club is one of the oldest clubs in Egypt and Africa. The club was taken over by the Egyptian government and converted to a national club in 1952. The club is best known for their handball and basketball team.

The club's basketball team is a three-time Egyptian Basketball Premier League champion, having recently won the 2017–18 season title.

Sporting's women's team won the FIBA Africa Women's Clubs Champions Cup in 2022, becoming the first Egyptian club to win the competition.

Honours

Men's team

National 
Egypt Super League
Champions (3): 2012–13, 2014–15, 2017–18

Egypt Basketball Cup
Champions (7): 1976–77, 2007–08, 2012–13, 2013–14, 2014–15, 2015–16, 2016–17
Egyptian Mortabat League
Champions (2): 2012–13, 2013–14

International 
FIBA Africa Basketball League

 Fourth Place (2): 2013, 2014

Women's team

National 
Egyptian Basketball Women's League

 Champions (2): 2021, 2022

Egyptian Basketball Women's Cup

 Winners (2): 2013, 2020

Egyptian Basketball Women's SuperCup

 Winners (2): 2017, 2021

International 
FIBA Africa Women's Clubs Champions Cup

 Champions (1): 2022
 Fourth Place (1): 2019

Notable players
To appear in this section a player must have either:
- Set a club record or won an individual award as a professional player.
- Played at least one official international match for his senior national team or one NBA game at any time.
 Omar Abdeen
 Ahmed Mounir.

Other sports

Volleyball
The club is currently active in the Egyptian Volleyball League

Football
The club is currently active in the Egyptian League B

Honors
Egyptian Third Division: 2019–20 (Group 11)

Handball
The club is currently active in the Egyptian Professional League

Honors
Egyptian Professional Super Cup: 2019
Egypt Cup: 2022
African Champions League runners-up: 2019
Arab Championship of Champions: 1997

References

External links
 Official website

Sports clubs established in 1890
Sports clubs in Alexandria
1890s establishments in Egypt